Modern pentathlon at the 2010 Summer Youth Olympics in Singapore took place August 21–23. It consisted of four of the five modern pentathlon disciplines: fencing, swimming, running and shooting. There was no riding.

Qualified athletes

Boys

Girls

Competition schedule

Medal summary

Medal table

Events

External links 
 Modern Pentathlon Results at the official site.

 
2010 Summer Youth Olympics events
2010 in modern pentathlon
2010
Modern pentathlon in Singapore